How Doth The Little Crocodile? was the first of two murder mystery novels written by twin authors Anthony and Peter Shaffer. It featured their eccentric detective Mr Verity who also appeared in their other novel Withered Murder.

History
How Doth The Little Crocodile? was first published in London by Evans in 1952 in the US by MacMillan in 1957 as part of their "Cock Robin Mystery" books. 

The first edition by Evans was published under the pseudonym Peter Anthony but this was changed to Anthony & Peter Shaffer by Macmillan. Another change to note is the detective's name goes from Mr Verity in the original to Mr Fathom in the US edition.

Value
Despite several attempts by publishers to have them reprinted, these books are now long out of print and copies in excellent condition can sell for high prices.

British mystery novels
Works published under a pseudonym